Adam Duncan may refer to:

Adam Duncan, 1st Viscount Duncan (1731–1804), British admiral
Adam Duncan (sailor) (1833–?), sailor in the Union Navy in the American Civil War, recipient of the Medal of Honor
Adam Duncan (cricketer) (1852–1940), English lawyer and cricketer
Scott Duncan (footballer) (1888–1975), Scottish footballer and manager
Adam M. Duncan (1927–2000), member of the Utah state legislature